Archaeology, Ethnology & Anthropology of Eurasia is a bilingual peer-reviewed academic journal covering anthropological and archaeological studies on Eurasia. It was established in 2000 by the Institute of Archaeology and Ethnography of Siberian Branch of the Russian Academy of Sciences. Since January 2008, the institute publishes it in association with Elsevier.

Abstracting and indexing
The journal is abstracted and indexed in:

Anthropological Literature
Art Source
EBSCO databases (Academic Search, Historical Abstracts)
Emerging Sources Citation Index
ERIH PLUS
Index Islamicus
Russian Science Citation Index
Scopus

Editor-in-chief
Since its establishment, Anatoly Pantelyevich Derevyanko is the editor-in-chief of the journal.

References

External links

Publications established in 2000
Anthropology journals
Archaeology journals
Russian Academy of Sciences academic journals
Elsevier academic journals
Multilingual journals
Quarterly journals
Delayed open access journals